Jorquera is a municipality in the province of Albacete, Castile-La Mancha, Spain.

Jorquera may also refer to:

 Jorquera River, Chile
 Jorquera (caldera), Atacama Region, Chile
 Navas de Jorquera, a municipality in Albacete, Castile-La Mancha, Spain

People 
 Albert Jorquera (b. 1979), Spanish footballer
 Andrés Jorquera Tapia (b. 1976), Chilean ski mountaineer and high mountain guide
 Cristóbal Jorquera (b. 1988), Chilean footballer
 Francisco Jorquera (b. 1961), Spanish politician
 José Jorquera (b. 1991), Chilean footballer